The Tanners Creek Formation is a geologic formation in Indiana. It preserves fossils dating back to the Ordovician period.

The formation takes its name from Tanners Creek, a tributary to the Ohio River.

See also

 List of fossiliferous stratigraphic units in Indiana

References
 

Ordovician Indiana
Ordovician southern paleotemperate deposits